The 1995 Women's EuroHockey Nations Championship was the fourth edition of the women's field hockey championship organised by the European Hockey Federation. It was held in Amstelveen, Netherlands from June 14 to June 25, 1995. In the final host Netherlands defeated reigning Olympic champion Spain after penalty strokes to clinch its third title.

Venue
Wagener Stadium

Squads

Umpires

 Judith Brinsfield
 Laura Crespo
 Jana Vudmanskova
 Mary Power
 Renée Cohen
 Lynne Fotheringham
 Ute Löwenstein
 Alyson Dale
 Renée Cohen
 Kazuko Yasueda
 Edna Rutten
 Lourdes Santiago Pinar
 Carla d'Alberto

Preliminary round

Group A

Wednesday June 14, 1995

Thursday June 15, 1995

Friday June 16, 1995

Saturday June 17, 1995

Monday June 19, 1995

Tuesday June 20, 1995

Wednesday June 21, 1995

Group B

Thursday June 15, 1995

Friday June 16, 1995

Sunday June 18, 1995

Monday June 19, 1995

Tuesday June 20, 1995

Wednesday June 21, 1995

Play-offs
Friday June 23, 1995

Saturday June 24, 1995

Sunday June 25, 1995

Awards

References
 EuroHockey Statistics

1995
1995 in women's field hockey
1995 in Dutch women's sport
1995 Women's EuroHockey Nations Championship
1995 Women's EuroHockey Nations Championship
June 1995 sports events in Europe